The Lithuania national rugby sevens team is a minor national sevens side. They won the Bowl in the 2005 FIRA European Sevens in Moscow.

Tournament history

Summer Olympics

Rugby World Cup Sevens

European Grand Prix Series

References

Rugby union in Lithuania
National rugby sevens teams
National sports teams of Lithuania